The year 1951 in film involved some significant events.

Top-grossing films

United States

The top ten 1951 released films by box office gross in the United States are as follows:

International
The highest-grossing 1951 films in countries outside of North America.

Worldwide gross
The following table lists known worldwide gross figures for several high-grossing films that originally released in 1951. Note that this list is incomplete and is therefore not representative of the highest-grossing films worldwide in 1951. This list also includes gross revenue from later re-releases.

Events
 February 15 – new management takes over at United Artists with Arthur B. Krim, Robert Benjamin and Matty Fox now in charge.
 April – French magazine Cahiers du cinéma is first published.
 July 26 – Walt Disney's Alice in Wonderland premieres; while a disappointment at first and hardly released in theaters, it would later become one of the biggest cult classics in the animation medium as well as make millions in television viewings and subsequent releases on home video.
 September 10 – Rashomon wins the Golden Lion at the Venice Film Festival, bringing worldwide attention to Japanese film.
 September – The House Un-American Activities Committee investigation into Communism in the film industry starts to wind up after four years.  They report in February 1952 that Hollywood has not done enough against Communist employees and hearings and blacklisting continues.
 December 29 – The Wilhelm scream, one of the most frequently-used stock sound effects, makes its first use in the film Distant Drums. The scream would not get its name until The Charge at Feather River in 1953.

Awards

Top ten money making stars

The Top Ten Money Making Stars Poll was published by Quigley Publishing Company based on a poll of U.S. movie theater owners who were asked to name who they felt were the previous year's top 10 moneymaking stars.

They also published a Western stars poll which Roy Rogers topped for the ninth year running.

Notable films released in 1951
United States release unless stated

#

The 13th Letter, directed by Otto Preminger, starring Linda Darnell and Charles Boyer

A
Abbott and Costello Meet the Invisible Man, starring Bud Abbott and Lou Costello
Ace in the Hole (a.k.a. The Big Carnival), directed by Billy Wilder, starring Kirk Douglas and Jan Sterling
Across the Wide Missouri, starring Clark Gable
The African Queen, directed by John Huston, starring Humphrey Bogart (Oscar for best actor) and Katharine Hepburn – (GB/US)
Air Cadet, starring Gail Russell and Stephen McNally
Alice in Wonderland, an animated film by Walt Disney
Along the Great Divide, starring Kirk Douglas
An American in Paris, directed by Vincente Minnelli, starring Gene Kelly and Leslie Caron (Oscar for best picture)
Angels in the Outfield, starring Paul Douglas and Janet Leigh
Anna, starring Silvana Mangano, Raf Vallone and Vittorio Gassman – (Italy)
Another Man's Poison, directed by Irving Rapper, starring Bette Davis, Gary Merrill, Emlyn Williams and Anthony Steel – (GB)
Apache Drums, starring Stephen McNally and Coleen Gray
Appointment with Danger, starring Alan Ladd, with future Dragnet (series) co-stars Jack Webb and Harry Morgan
Appointment with Venus, starring Glynis Johns and David Niven – (U.K.)
As Young as You Feel, starring Monty Woolley
Atoll K, starring Laurel and Hardy in their final film
Awaara (Tramp), directed by and starring Raj Kapoor – (India)
The Axe of Wandsbek (Das Beil von Wandsbek) – (East Germany)

B
Badal (Cloud), starring Madhubala and Prem Nath – (India)
Baazi (Gamble), starring Dev Anand – (India)
Bedtime for Bonzo, starring Ronald Reagan (with a chimpanzee)
Bellissima, directed by Luchino Visconti, starring Anna Magnani – (Italy)
Blackmailed, starring Mai Zetterling and Dirk Bogarde – (GB)
The Blue Veil, starring Jane Wyman
Bright Victory, starring Arthur Kennedy
The Browning Version, directed by Anthony Asquith, starring Michael Redgrave and Jean Kent – (GB)
Bullfighter and the Lady, starring Robert Stack and Joy Page

C
Callaway Went Thataway, starring Fred MacMurray, Dorothy McGuire, Howard Keel
Call Me Mister, starring Betty Grable
Captain Horatio Hornblower, starring Gregory Peck – (GB)
Cattle Drive, starring Joel McCrea, Dean Stockwell and Chill Wills
Cause for Alarm!, starring Loretta Young and Barry Sullivan
China Corsair, starring Jon Hall
Circle of Danger, starring Ray Milland – (GB)
The Clouded Yellow, starring Trevor Howard and Jean Simmons – (GB)
Come Fill the Cup, starring James Cagney and Gig Young
Comin' Round The Mountain, starring Abbott and Costello
Cops and Robbers (Guardie e ladri), directed by Mario Monicelli – (Italy)
Cry Danger, starring Dick Powell and Rhonda Fleming
Cry, the Beloved Country, directed by Zoltan Korda, starring Sidney Poitier – (GB)

D
Darling, How Could You!, starring Joan Fontaine
Daughter of Deceit (La hija del engaño), directed by Luis Buñuel – (Mexico)
David and Bathsheba, starring Gregory Peck and Susan Hayward
The Day the Earth Stood Still, directed by Robert Wise, starring Michael Rennie and Patricia Neal
Death of a Salesman, starring Fredric March
 Deburau, directed by Sacha Guitry – (France)
Decision Before Dawn, starring Richard Basehart, Gary Merrill and Oskar Werner
Deedar, starring Ashok Kumar, Dilip Kumar, Nargis – (India)
The Desert Fox: The Story of Rommel, starring James Mason
Detective Story, starring Kirk Douglas, Eleanor Parker, William Bendix, Lee Grant, Horace McMahon, and George Macready
Diary of a Country Priest (Journal d'un curé de campagne), directed by Robert Bresson – (France)
Distant Drums, directed by Raoul Walsh, starring Gary Cooper
Double Dynamite, starring Jane Russell, Frank Sinatra and Groucho Marx
Dream of a Cossack (Kavalier zolotoy zvezdy), starring Sergei Bondarchuk – (U.S.S.R.)
 Daar Doer in Die Bosveld (Far Away in the Bushveld), starring Jamie Uys – (South Africa)

E
Early Summer (Bakushū), directed by Yasujirō Ozu – (Japan)
Encore, starring Nigel Patrick and Kay Walsh – (GB)
The Enforcer (Murder, Inc.), starring Humphrey Bogart and Zero Mostel

F
FBI Girl, starring Audrey Totter and Cesar Romero
The Family Secret, starring John Derek and Lee J. Cobb
Father's Little Dividend, starring Spencer Tracy and Elizabeth Taylor
The Fighting Seventh (a.k.a. Little Big Horn), starring Lloyd Bridges
Flying Leathernecks, starring John Wayne and Robert Ryan
Follow the Sun, starring Glenn Ford (as Ben Hogan)
The Forbidden Christ (Il Cristo proibito), starring Raf Vallone – (Italy)
Fort Worth, starring Randolph Scott
Four in a Jeep (Die Vier im Jeep), starring Ralph Meeker and Viveca Lindfors – (Switzerland)
Fourteen Hours, starring Paul Douglas, Richard Basehart, Jeffrey Hunter and Grace Kelly
The Frogmen, starring Richard Widmark and Dana Andrews
Furrows (Surcos) – (Spain)

G
Go for Broke!, starring Van Johnson
Golden Girl, starring Mitzi Gaynor, Dale Robertson, Dennis Day
The Golden Horde, starring Ann Blyth
Goodbye My Fancy, starring Joan Crawford and Robert Young
The Great Caruso, starring Mario Lanza
The Great Missouri Raid, starring Wendell Corey
The Groom Wore Spurs, starring Ginger Rogers
Grounds for Marriage, starring Kathryn Grayson and Van Johnson
The Guy Who Came Back, starring Paul Douglas

H
Half Angel, starring Loretta Young
Happy Go Lovely, starring David Niven and Vera-Ellen – (GB)
He Ran All the Way, starring John Garfield and Shelley Winters
Here Comes the Groom, directed by Frank Capra, starring Bing Crosby
His Kind of Woman, starring Robert Mitchum, Jane Russell, Vincent Price and Raymond Burr
The House in Montevideo (Das Haus in Montevideo) – (West Germany)
The House on Telegraph Hill, starring Richard Basehart

I
I Can Get It for You Wholesale, starring Susan Hayward
I'll Never Forget You
I'll See You in My Dreams
I Want You, directed by Mark Robson, starring Dana Andrews
The Idiot (Hakuchi), directed by Akira Kurosawa – (Japan)
Inside the Walls of Folsom Prison, starring Steve Cochran

J
Jim Thorpe – All-American, starring Burt Lancaster
Journey Into Light, directed by Stuart Heisler, starring Sterling Hayden
Juliette, or Key of Dreams (Juliette ou La clef des songes), directed by Marcel Carné – (France)

K
Kind Lady, directed by John Sturges, starring Ethel Barrymore, Maurice Evans, Keenan Wynn, Angela Lansbury
Kon-Tiki, a documentary directed by and starring Thor Heyerdahl – (Norway)

L
The Last Outpost, starring Ronald Reagan
Laughter in Paradise, starring Alastair Sim – (GB)
The Lavender Hill Mob, directed by Charles Crichton, starring Alec Guinness, Stanley Holloway, Sid James and Alfie Bass, with an early appearance by Audrey Hepburn – (GB)
The Lemon Drop Kid, starring Bob Hope, Marilyn Maxwell, William Frawley and Tor Johnson
Let's Go Crazy, starring Spike Milligan and Peter Sellers – (GB)
Leva på 'Hoppet', starring Ingrid Thulin – (Sweden)
Lightning Strikes Twice, starring Ruth Roman and Mercedes McCambridge
Little Egypt, starring Rhonda Fleming and Mark Stevens
The Long Dark Hall, starring Rex Harrison – (GB)
Lost Continent, starring Cesar Romero
Love Nest, starring June Haver and Marilyn Monroe
Lullaby of Broadway

M
The Magic Box, starring Robert Donat, a biopic of William Friese-Greene – (GB)
The Man with a Cloak, starring Joseph Cotten
The Magnificent Yankee, starring Louis Calhern
Malliswari, starring N.T. Rama Rao – (India)
The Man in the White Suit, directed by Alexander Mackendrick, starring Alec Guinness, Joan Greenwood, Cecil Parker, Michael Gough and Ernest Thesiger – (GB)
 The Man With the Twisted Lip (British TV movie) a Sherlock Holmes mystery directed by Richard M. Grey, starring John Longden as Sherlock Holmes and Campbell Singer as Watson
The Mating Season, starring Gene Tierney, John Lund, Miriam Hopkins and Thelma Ritter
The Medium, starring Marie Powers – (Italy)
Miracle in Milan (Miracolo a Milano), directed by Vittorio De Sica – (Italy)
Miss Julie (Fröken Julie), directed by Alf Sjöberg – (Sweden)
The Model and the Marriage Broker, starring Jeanne Crain, Thelma Ritter, Scott Brady, Zero Mostel
Mr. Imperium, starring Lana Turner and Ezio Pinza
My Favorite Spy, starring Bob Hope and Hedy Lamarr

N
New Mexico, starring Lew Ayres and Marilyn Maxwell
The Night Before Christmas (Noch pered Rozhdestvom) – (U.S.S.R.)
No Highway in the Sky (No Highway), starring James Stewart, Glynis Johns and Marlene Dietrich – (GB)

O
Olivia, directed by Jacqueline Audry – (France)
On Dangerous Ground, starring Ida Lupino and Robert Ryan
On Moonlight Bay, starring Doris Day and Gordon MacRae
On the Riviera, starring Danny Kaye
One Summer of Happiness (Hon dansade en sommar) – (Sweden)
Only the Valiant, starring Gregory Peck

P
Painting the Clouds with Sunshine, starring Virginia Mayo
Pandora and the Flying Dutchman, starring Ava Gardner and James Mason – (GB)
Paris Vice Squad (Identité judiciaire) – (France)
Payment on Demand, starring Bette Davis and Barry Sullivan
Penny Points to Paradise, starring Harry Secombe, Peter Sellers and Spike Milligan – (GB)
The People Against O'Hara, starring Spencer Tracy
People Will Talk, starring Cary Grant, Jeanne Crain, Hume Cronyn and Finlay Currie
A Place in the Sun, directed by George Stevens, starring Montgomery Clift, Elizabeth Taylor, Shelley Winters and Raymond Burr
Pool of London, directed by Basil Dearden, starring Leslie Phillips, James Robertson Justice and Earl Cameron – (GB)
The Prowler, directed by Joseph Losey, starring Van Heflin and Evelyn Keyes

Q
Quo Vadis, directed by Mervyn LeRoy, starring Robert Taylor, Deborah Kerr, Peter Ustinov and Leo Genn

R
The Racket, starring Robert Mitchum
The Raging Tide, starring Richard Conte and Shelley Winters
Rawhide, starring Tyrone Power and Susan Hayward
The Red Badge of Courage, directed by John Huston, starring Audie Murphy
Red Mountain, starring Alan Ladd and Lizabeth Scott
Repast (Meshi), directed by Mikio Naruse, written by the novelist Yasunari Kawabata – (Japan)
El revoltoso (The Rebellious) – (Mexico)
Rhubarb, starring Ray Milland, Jan Sterling, William Frawley and Leonard Nimoy
Rich, Young and Pretty, starring Jane Powell
The River (Le Fleuve), directed by Jean Renoir – (France/India/US)
Royal Wedding, starring Fred Astaire, Peter Lawford and Jane Powell

S
...Sans laisser d'adresse (No Forwarding Address), starring Bernard Blier and Danièle Delorme – (France)
Santa Fe, starring Randolph Scott
Saturday's Hero, starring John Derek and Donna Reed
Scrooge (A Christmas Carol), starring Alastair Sim – (GB)
The Secret of Convict Lake, starring Glenn Ford and Gene Tierney
Selamat Berdjuang, Masku!, starring Raden Sukarno and Marlia Hardi – (Indonesia)
 Sherlock Holmes (British) series of 6 made-for TV Sherlock Holmes films directed by C. A. Lajeune, all starring Alan Wheatley as Holmes and Raymond Francis as Watson
Show Boat, a remake of the hit musical, starring Kathryn Grayson, Howard Keel, and Ava Gardner, with songs by Oscar Hammerstein II and Jerome Kern
Silver City, starring Edmond O'Brien and Yvonne De Carlo
 The Sinner, directed by Willi Forst, starring Hildegard Knef and Gustav Fröhlich (West Germany)
Sirocco, starring Humphrey Bogart and Märta Torén
Slaughter Trail, starring Gig Young and Virginia Grey
Smuggler's Island, starring Jeff Chandler and Evelyn Keyes
Spring Season (Bahar), first Hindi film of Vyjayanthimala and the producer A. V. Meiyappan – (India)
Starlift, starring Janice Rule and Ruth Roman
The Steel Helmet, directed by Samuel Fuller
Storm Warning, starring Ginger Rogers, Ronald Reagan and Doris Day
The Strange Door, starring Charles Laughton and Boris Karloff
Strangers on a Train, directed by Alfred Hitchcock, starring Farley Granger and Robert Walker
A Streetcar Named Desire, directed by Elia Kazan, starring Vivien Leigh (Oscar for best actress), Marlon Brando, Kim Hunter and Karl Malden
Strictly Dishonorable, starring Ezio Pinza and Janet Leigh
The Strip, starring Mickey Rooney and Sally Forrest
Sugarfoot, starring Randolph Scott
Summer Interlude (Sommarlek), directed by Ingmar Bergman – (Sweden)
Superman and the Mole Men, starring George Reeves
Susana (a.k.a. The Devil and the Flesh), directed by Luis Buñuel – (Mexico)
The Sword of Monte Cristo, starring George Montgomery

T
Take Care of My Little Girl, directed by Jean Negulesco, starring Jeanne Crain and Mitzi Gaynor
A Tale of Five Cities (Passaporto per l'oriente) – (Italy/GB)
The Tale of Genji (Genji Monogatari) – (Japan)
The Tales of Hoffmann, a cinematic opera directed by Powell and Pressburger and starring Moira Shearer – (GB)
The Tall Target, starring Dick Powell, Adolphe Menjou, Marshall Thompson and Ruby Dee
Tarana, starring Madhubala and Dilip Kumar – (India)
That Happy Couple (Esa pareja feliz), directed by Juan Antonio Bardem and Luis García Berlanga – (Spain)
That's My Boy, starring Dean Martin and Jerry Lewis
The Thing from Another World, produced by Howard Hawks, starring Kenneth Tobey and James Arness as the title creature
Three Guys Named Mike, starring Jane Wyman
Thunder on the Hill, directed by Douglas Sirk, starring Claudette Colbert and Ann Blyth
Tom Brown's Schooldays, starring John Howard Davies and Robert Newton – (GB)
Tomahawk, starring Van Heflin and Yvonne De Carlo
Two of a Kind, starring Edmond O'Brien and Lizabeth Scott
Two Tickets to Broadway, starring Janet Leigh, Tony Martin, Gloria DeHaven

V
Vengeance Valley, starring Burt Lancaster and Joanne Dru
Victimas del Pecado (Victims of Sin) – (Mexico)

W
Warpath, starring Edmond O'Brien, Forrest Tucker, Polly Bergen
Warsaw Premiere, directed by Jan Rybkowski (Poland)
The Well, starring Harry Morgan
Westward the Women, starring Robert Taylor
When Worlds Collide, starring Richard Derr, Barbara Rush, Larry Keating, John Hoyt and Hayden Rorke
Where No Vultures Fly, directed by Harry Watt, starring Anthony Steel, Dinah Sheridan, Harold Warrender and Meredith Edwards – (U.K.)

Y
You Never Can Tell, starring Dick Powell
Young Wives' Tale, starring Joan Greenwood – (GB)
You're in the Navy Now, starring Gary Cooper
Your Day Will Come (Lak Yawm Ya Zalem) – (Egypt)

Serials
Captain Video: Master of the Stratosphere, starring Judd Holdren
Don Daredevil Rides Again, starring Ken Curtis and Aline Towne
Government Agents vs Phantom Legion, starring Walter Reed
Mysterious Island, starring Richard Crane
Roar of the Iron Horse, starring Buster Crabbe

Short film series
Mickey Mouse (1928–1956)
Looney Tunes (1930–1969)
Merrie Melodies (1931–1969)
Popeye (1933–1957)
The Three Stooges (1934–1959)
Donald Duck (1936–1956)
Pluto (1937–1951)
Goofy (1939–1953)
Tom and Jerry (1940–1958)
Bugs Bunny (1940–1964)
Mighty Mouse (1942–1955)
Chip and Dale (1943–1956)
Yosemite Sam (1945–1963)
Terrytoons (1930–1971)
Noveltoons (1944–1967)

Births
January 1
Brent Jennings, American actor
Nana Patekar, Indian actor, screenwriter, and film director
David Schofield (actor), English actor
January 8 – John McTiernan, American director
January 12 – Kirstie Alley, American actress (died 2022)
January 15
Charo, Spanish American actress, singer and comedian
Basil Wallace, Jamaican-born American actor
January 23 - David Patrick Kelly, American actor and musician
January 29 - Maria Klenskaja, Estonian actress (died 2022)
January 30 - Phil Collins, English drummer, singer, songwriter, multi-instrumentalist, record producer and actor
February 5 - Robin Sachs, English actor (died 2013)
February 13 – David Naughton, American actor & singer
February 15
Paul Kandel, American actor and singer
Jane Seymour, English actress
February 16 – William Katt, American actor
February 20 - Eva Rueber-Staier, Austrian actress, television host and model
February 22 – Ellen Greene, American singer and actress
March 17 – Kurt Russell, American actor
April 6 – Rita Raave, Estonian actress
April 11 - Gerry Becker, American actor (died 2019)
April 12 – Tom Noonan, American actor
April 13 - John Furey, American actor
April 17 – Olivia Hussey, Argentine-born English actress
April 21 – Tony Danza, American actor and boxer
May 4 - Gérard Jugnot, French actor, director, screenwriter and producer
May 8 - Cooper Huckabee, American actor
May 29 - Michael O'Neill (actor), American actor
May 30 – Stephen Tobolowsky, American actor
June 1 - Lena Farugia, American-born South African actress, screenwriter, director and producer (died 2019)
June 2 - Frank C. Turner, Canadian actor
June 5 - Mark Harelik, American actor and playwright
June 9 – James Newton Howard, American film composer
June 13 - Stellan Skarsgård, Swedish actor
June 16 - John Salthouse, British actor and producer
June 20 - Tress MacNeille, American voice actress, and singer
June 27 - Julia Duffy, American actress
July 1 - Trevor Eve, English actor
July 4 – Vincent Marzello, American-born actor (died 2020)
July 6 – Geoffrey Rush, Australian actor
July 7 - Roz Ryan, American actress, singer, voice actress and comedian
July 8 – Anjelica Huston, American actress
July 9 – Chris Cooper, American actor
July 10 – Phyllis Smith, American actress
July 12 – Cheryl Ladd, American actress
July 13 - Didi Conn, American actress
July 18 - Margo Martindale, American character actress
July 21 – Robin Williams, American actor & comedian (died 2014)
July 24
Lynda Carter, American actress & singer
Fiona Reid, English-born Canadian actress
July 29
Jack Blessing, American actor (died 2017)
Gavan O'Herlihy, Irish-born American actor (died 2021)
August 2 - Marcel Iureș, Romanian actor
August 6 – Catherine Hicks, American actress
August 8 - Martin Brest, American director, screenwriter and producer
August 14 – Carl Lumbly, American actor
August 18 - Teri McMinn, American actress and model
August 21 - Randy Thom, American sound designer
August 22 - Gordon Liu, Chinese martial arts actor
August 30 – Timothy Bottoms, American actor
September 2 - Mark Harmon, American actor
September 4 - Judith Ivey, American actress
September 5 – Michael Keaton, American actor
September 9 - Tom Wopat, American actor and singer
September 12 – Joe Pantoliano, American actor
September 13 - Jean Smart, American actress
September 17 – Cassandra Peterson, American actress
September 22 – Amanda Mackey, American casting director (died 2022)
September 25 – Mark Hamill, American actor
October 4 – James Rankin, Canadian actor
October 5 - Karen Allen, American actress
October 14 - John Sumner (actor, born 1951), English character actor
October 16 - Morgan Stevens, American actor (died 2022)
October 22 - Marshall Napier, New Zealand character actor (died 2022)
October 24 - Antoñito Ruiz, Spanish former child actor and stuntman
October 28 - Renato Cecchetto, Italian actor and voice actor (died 2022)
October 30 – Harry Hamlin, American actor
November 9 – Lou Ferrigno, American actor
November 11 - Bill Moseley, American actor and musician
November 15 – Beverly D'Angelo, American actress
November 16 - Miguel Sandoval, American actor
November 17
Francis Guinan, American actor
Stephen Root, American actor and voice actor
November 20 – Rodger Bumpass, American actor & voice actor
November 27 – Kathryn Bigelow, American director
December 1
Obba Babatundé, American actor
Treat Williams, American actor
December 16 - Bill Johnson (film and television actor), American actor

Deaths

January 11 – Charles W. Goddard, American playwright, screenwriter (born 1879), The Exploits of Elaine
January 18 – Jack Holt, American actor (born 1888), Flight, San Francisco
March 6 – Ivor Novello, Welsh actor, singer, composer (born 1893), The Lodger, I Lived with You
March 14 – Val Lewton, Russian-American director (born 1904), Cat People, The Body Snatcher
March 25 – Oscar Micheaux, American director, author (born 1884), The Girl From Chicago
April 4 – Al Christie, Canadian-born director, producer (born 1881), Charley's Aunt
April 22 – Stanley Ridges, British actor (born 1890), To Be or Not to Be, Sergeant York
May 2 – Edwin L. Marin, American director (born 1899), Fort Worth, Maisie 
May 2 – Paul L. Stein, Austrian director (born 1892), Red Wagon, The Twenty Questions Murder Mystery
May 7 – Warner Baxter, American actor (born 1882), 42nd Street, Crime Doctor
May 17 – S. Sylvan Simon, American director (born 1910), The Fuller Brush Man, I Love Trouble
May 29 – Fanny Brice, American entertainer and actress, My Man, Everybody Sing
June 2 – Ernst Pittschau, German actor (born 1883), The Picture of Dorian Gray
June 6 – Olive Tell, American actress (born 1894), The Trap
June 9 – Mayo Methot, American actress (born 1904), Marked Woman
July 23 – Robert J. Flaherty, American documentary filmmaker (born 1884), Nanook of the North
August 16 – Louis Jouvet, French actor (born 1887), Hôtel du Nord
August 28 – Robert Walker, American actor (born 1918), Strangers on a Train, The Clock
August 30 – Konstantin Märska, Estonian cinematographer (born 1896)
September 7 – Maria Montez, Dominican-born actress (born 1912), Arabian Nights, Ali Baba and the Forty Thieves
October 12 – Leon Errol, Australian-born actor (born 1881), Never Give a Sucker an Even Break, Joe Palooka
October 22 – Phil Rosen, Polish-American director (born 1876), Charlie Chan in The Chinese Cat, Roar of the Press
November 3 – Richard Wallace, American director (born 1894), Tycoon, Framed

Film Debuts 
Ernest Borgnine – China Corsair
Jeff Bridges – The Company She Keeps
Charles Bronson – You're in the Navy Now
Leslie Caron – An American in Paris
John Cassavetes – Fourteen Hours
Scatman Crothers – Yes Sir, Mr. Bones
James Dean – Fixed Bayonets!
Mamie Van Doren – Footlight Varieties
Lee Grant – Detective Story
Jeffrey Hunter – Fourteen Hours
Grace Kelly – Fourteen Hours
Harvey Lembeck – You're in the Navy Now
Lee Marvin – You're in the Navy Now
Patty McCormack – Two Gals and a Guy
Leonard Nimoy – Queen for a Day
William Shatner – The Butler's Night Off
Robert Shaw – The Lavender Hill Mob
Rod Steiger – Teresa
Jack Warden – You're in the Navy Now
Joseph Wiseman – Detective Story

Notes

References

 
Film by year